Julio Castro may refer to:

 Julio Castro (sport shooter) (1879–?), Spanish sports shooter
 Julio César Castro (1928–2003), Uruguayan comedian, actor and dramatist
 Julio Castro Méndez, Venezuelan doctor

See also
 Julian Castro (born 1974), American politician